Traian Stănescu (27 March 1940 – 12 April 2022) was a Romanian actor.

Biography  

He graduated from the Institute of Theater and Cinematography in Bucharest (IATC) in 1961, the class of Professor G.D. Loghin, after which he was assigned to the State Theater Piatra Neamț (currently the Youth Theater). The period spent here (1961 - 1964) is a beautiful page in his acting career, a period he remembered with pleasure: he had the opportunity to play in memorable premieres (he plays the role of Vulpașin in "Miss Nastasia”, Tom, in “Glass Menagerie”, directed by Cornel Todea etc.) and had the opportunity to be a member of a young and valuable artistic collective. 

He returned to Bucharest in 1964, first to the Giulești Theater, then to the Small Theater, so that from 1968 he became an actor of the National Theater "I. L. Caragiale”, and since 2002 as an honorary member.

He had played in countless plays throughout his career, including "The Enigma of Otilia", "King Lear", "Richard III", "Who Needs Theater", "Orpheus in Hell", "Swallow", "Bloody Lovers”, “Saturday, Sunday, Monday” etc. He has collaborated on several Radio and TV theater performances; long filmographic activity.

Personal life and death 

He was married from 1977 to the actress Ilinca Tomoroveanu until her death and they had a son together, Mihai Stănescu, and he is also an actor. Stănescu died in Bucharest on 12 April 2022, at the age of 82.

Filmography 
 Răscoala (1966) 
 Trandafirul galben (1982) - aga Mavrodineanu
 The Silver Mask (1985) - aga Villara
 Colierul de turcoaze (1986) - aga Villara
 Oglinda (1994) - Constantin Titel Petrescu, president of Social Democratic Party
 Ochii care nu se văd (1996) - Suru
 Fetele Marinarului (TV Series) (2009) - The priest
 Moștenirea (TV Series) (2010 - 2011) - Ghiță

References

External links 

 

1940 births
2022 deaths
Romanian male film actors
20th-century Romanian male actors
21st-century Romanian male actors
People from Timiș County
Romanian male stage actors
Romanian male television actors